Simone Blum (born 22 March 1989  in Freising) is a German show jumper. In 2018, she won the individual gold medal at the 2018 World Equestrian Games on her horse DSP Alice.

Showjumping 

Simone Blum started as an eventing rider, but quickly decided to specialise in show jumping. At 15, she finished fourth at the European Pony Championships. In 2015, she won silver, 2016 gold at the German Women's Championships. In 2017 she entered the open classification and immediately became German champion with the mare DSP Alice. Then she was called to the A-squad.

In July 2018 Blum and Alice were part of the victorious German team in the Nations Cup of Aachen. After which, she was called up for the 2018 World Equestrian Games in Tryon, North Carolina , where she won individual gold and team bronze. She was a surprise winner despite being the only rider to have a clear round in all 5 stages of the competition. She was the first German rider to ever win an individual gold medal at the World Equestrian Games within the showjumping competition.

International Championship Results

Personal life 

Blum lives in Zolling near Munich. She is the daughter of the Olympic eventing rider Jürgen Blum.

She has a Master's degree in chemistry and biology from the Technical University of Munich  In October 2018, Simone Blum married her partner, the show jumper Hans-Günter Blum (born Goskowitz).

Horses 

 DSP Alice (2007 Chestnut German Sport Horse Mare)

References 

Show jumping
1989 births
German event riders
Living people
German female equestrians
People from Freising
Sportspeople from Upper Bavaria
20th-century German women
21st-century German women